A general election was held in the U.S. state of Vermont on November 5, 2002. All of Vermont's executive officers were up for election as well as Vermont's at-large seat in the United States House of Representatives.

Governor

Lieutenant Governor

Incumbent Democratic lieutenant governor Doug Racine (since 1997) did not run again for a fourth term, instead ran for governor.

Republican primary
Brian E. Dubie was unopposed in the Republican primary. He previously ran for lieutenant governor as the Republican nominee in 2000.

Democratic primary
State Senator Peter Shumlin was unopposed in the Democratic primary.

Candidates
 Peter Shumlin, member of the Vermont Senate from Windham County (1993-2003), Member of the Vermont House of Representatives (1990-1993)

Progressive primary
Anthony Pollina, Progressive nominee for Governor in 2000 and U.S. Representative in 1984, ran unopposed in the Progressive primary.

Grassroots nomination
Sally Ann Jones, activist, ran unopposed for the Grassroots State Committee's nomination.

General election

Candidates
Brian E. Dubie (R)
Sally Ann Jones (GR)
Anthony Pollina (P)
Peter Shumlin (D)

Results

Secretary of State

Incumbent Democratic Secretary of State Deborah Markowitz (since 1999) ran again for a third term.

Democratic primary
Markowitz ran unopposed in the Democratic primary.

Republican primary
Bertrand ran unopposed in the Republican primary.

Progressive primary
Markowitz also ran unopposed in the Progressive primary as a write-in candidate.

Liberty Union nomination
Leslie Yvonne Scaffidi, Liberty Union nominee for Secretary of State in 2000, ran unopposed for the Liberty Union State Committee's nomination.

Grassroots nomination
Tina M. Thompson ran unopposed for the Grassroots State Committee's nomination.

General election

Candidates
Michael S. Bertrand (R)
Deborah Markowitz (D)
Leslie Yvonne Scaffidi (LU)
Tina M. Thompson (GR)

Results

Treasurer

Incumbent Republican treasurer Jim Douglas (since 1995) did not run again for a fifth term, instead ran for governor.

Democratic primary

Candidates
Ed Flanagan, Democratic nominee for U.S. Senate in 2000
Jeb Spaulding, Member of the Vermont Senate (1985-2001)

Results

Republican primary
John V. Labarge, Member of the Vermont House of Representatives (1993-2003), ran unopposed in the Republican primary.

Liberty Union nomination
Jerry Levy, Liberty Union nominee for U.S. Senate in 2000, 1998, 1994, 1992, 1988, 1986, and 1982, Vermont Secretary of State in 1984, and auditor in 1980, ran unopposed for the Liberty Union State Committee's nomination.

Grassroots nomination
Claude Bouchard, Republican candidate for State Representative from Franklin-3 in the 2002 primary, ran unopposed for the Grassroots State Committee's nomination.

General election

Candidates
John V. Labarge (R)
Jerry Levy (LU)
Jeb Spaulding (D)
Claude Bouchard (GR)

Results

Attorney General

Incumbent Attorney General William H. Sorrell (since 1997) ran again for a fourth term.

Democratic primary
Sorrell was unopposed in the Democratic primary.

Republican primary
Larry Drown, Republican nominee for Secretary of State in 2000, Democratic nominee for State Representative from Washington-1 in 1998, and Reform Party nominee for State Senator from Washington County in 1996, ran unopposed in the Republican primary.

Progressive primary

Candidates
Cindy Hill, candidate for Attorney General in 1998
Boots Wardinski, Liberty Union nominee for State Representative in 2000, 1998, 1996, and for State Senator in 1992 and 1990, farmer

Results

Liberty Union nomination
After losing the Progressive primary, Boots Wardinski ran unopposed for the Liberty Union State Committee's nomination.

Libertarian nomination
Christopher Costanzo, Libertarian nominee for State Senator in 2000, for Attorney General in 1998, and for Secretary of State in 1996, ran unopposed for the Libertarian State Committee's nomination.

Grassroots nomination
Mann Ward ran unopposed for the Grassroots State Committee's nomination.

General election

Candidates
Christopher Costanzo (L)
Larry Drown (R)
Cindy Hill (P)
William H. Sorrell (D)
Boots Wardinski (LU)
Mann Ward (GR)

Results

Auditor of Accounts

Incumbent Democratic Auditor Elizabeth M. Ready (since 2001) ran again for a second term.

Democratic primary
Ready ran unopposed in the Democratic primary.

Republican primary
Bruce Hyde, former State Representative (1995-2001), ran unopposed in the Republican primary.

Liberty Union nomination
Murray Ngoima, Liberty Union nominee for Lieutenant Governor in 1996 and for Treasurer in 1994, 1992, and 1990, ran unopposed for the Liberty Union State Committee's nomination.

Libertarian nomination
Dennis Lane, Libertarian nominee for Secretary of State in 1998, and Grassroots nominee for Governor in 1996 and 1994, ran unopposed for the Libertarian State Committee's nomination.

Grassroots nomination
Lynn Appleby ran unopposed for the Grassroots State Committee's nomination.

General election

Candidates
Lynn Appleby (GR)
Bruce Hyde (R)
Dennis Lane (L)
Murray Ngoima (LU)
Elizabeth M. Ready (D)

Results

References

External links

 
Vermont